Schizaea dichotoma,  the branched comb fern is a small plant usually found in open forest or heath, often on sandy soils. The habit is mostly upright, with up to 20 segments, twice or more times branched. Found in Australia, New Zealand, Papua New Guinea, Malesia and islands in the Pacific Ocean. A low plant, 20 to 40 cm tall. The specific epithet dichotoma is derived from Greek, meaning "twice cut", referring to the branched nature of the fronds. This plant first appeared in scientific literature in the year 1753 as Acrostichum dichotomum, published in the Species Plantarum by Carl Linnaeus.

References

Schizaeales
Flora of Australia
Flora of New Zealand
Flora of New Caledonia
Flora of Malesia
Flora of New Guinea
Plants described in 1753
Taxa named by Carl Linnaeus